Andrew McNab (born April 11, 1984) is a Canadian ski mountaineer and member of the national selection.

McNab was born in Revelstoke, British Columbia, and studied at Thompson Rivers University.

Selected results 
 2012:
 2nd (and 4th in the World ranking), North American Championship, sprint
 6th (and 8th in the World ranking), North American Championship, individual
 6th (and 8th in the World ranking), North American Championship, total ranking

References 

1984 births
Living people
Canadian male ski mountaineers
People from Revelstoke, British Columbia